Alexei Yuryevich "Alex" Zhamnov (born October 1, 1970) is the current head coach of the Russia men's national ice hockey team and former professional ice hockey centre who played in the National Hockey League (NHL) for the Winnipeg Jets, Chicago Blackhawks, Philadelphia Flyers and Boston Bruins. He is the general manager of HC Spartak Moscow of the Kontinental Hockey League (KHL). He previously served as general manager of Vityaz Chekhov and Atlant Moscow Oblast.

Playing career
Alexei Zhamnov was drafted by the Winnipeg Jets in the 4th round, 77th overall, in the 1990 NHL Entry Draft. After the 1992 Olympics, he began his career with the Jets in the 1992–93 season.

Zhamnov centred the Jets formidable "Olympic line" with teammates Keith Tkachuk and Teemu Selanne, with all three being Olympians for their respective countries. 

Zhamnov's tenure with the Jets was very successful, having managed over a point per game in each of his four seasons there. His best season was his third season, where he led the Jets in scoring. Of particular note was when he scored 5 goals against the Los Angeles Kings on April 1, 1995. The game would ultimately end in a 7–7 tie.

After the Jets moved to Phoenix, Zhamnov was traded by the Phoenix Coyotes (having never suited up for them) to the Chicago Blackhawks in exchange for Jeremy Roenick in the summer of 1996. While he no longer maintained his point per game scoring pace with the Blackhawks, he ironically had offensive success with Roenick's childhood friend Tony Amonte. During his tenure with the Blackhawks he would serve as team captain from 2002 to 2004.

He was then traded by Chicago to the Philadelphia Flyers for Jim Vandermeer, Colin Fraser, and a 2nd round selection in the 2004 NHL Entry Draft.

In 2005 Zhamnov signed with the Boston Bruins as a free agent.

He was placed on long-term injury list by the Boston Bruins on November 5, 2005, and retired in 2006.

International play
Zhamnov has been a part of three Olympic Games, winning gold, silver, and bronze medals with the Unified Team and Russian teams. He was selected to play in 2006, but did not participate due to injury. During the 2004–05 NHL lockout, Zhamnov spent time playing in his homeland.

Awards
1992: Olympic gold medal winner
1994–95: NHL Second All-Star team
1998: Olympic silver medal winner
2002: Olympic bronze medal winner
2001–02: Played in the All-Star Game

Career statistics

Regular season and playoffs

International

References

External links
 

1970 births
Living people
Boston Bruins players
Chicago Blackhawks captains
Chicago Blackhawks players
HC Dynamo Moscow players
Ice hockey players at the 1992 Winter Olympics
Ice hockey players at the 1998 Winter Olympics
Ice hockey players at the 2002 Winter Olympics
National Hockey League All-Stars
Olympic bronze medalists for Russia
Olympic gold medalists for the Unified Team
Olympic ice hockey players of Russia
Olympic ice hockey players of the Unified Team
Olympic medalists in ice hockey
Olympic silver medalists for Russia
Philadelphia Flyers players
Russia men's national ice hockey team coaches
Russian ice hockey centres
Soviet ice hockey centres
Ice hockey people from Moscow
HC Vityaz players
Winnipeg Jets (1979–1996) draft picks
Winnipeg Jets (1979–1996) players
Medalists at the 2002 Winter Olympics
Medalists at the 1998 Winter Olympics
Medalists at the 1992 Winter Olympics
Ice hockey coaches at the 2022 Winter Olympics
Russian expatriate sportspeople in Canada
Russian expatriate sportspeople in the United States
Russian expatriate ice hockey people
Expatriate ice hockey players in the United States
Expatriate ice hockey players in Canada